Bernard Goueffic (born 29 January 1947) is a French former professional footballer who played for Rennes, FC Lorient, Amicale de Lucé and CO Briochin.

Goueffic also enjoyed a career as a manager with Amicale de Lucé, FC Lorient and CO Briochin.

References

External links
 

1947 births
Living people
French footballers
Stade Rennais F.C. players
FC Lorient players
Ligue 1 players
Olympic footballers of France
Footballers at the 1968 Summer Olympics
French football managers
FC Lorient managers
Sportspeople from Saint-Brieuc
Association football defenders
Footballers from Brittany